Miroslav Poliaček (born 13 July 1983) is a Slovak football midfielder who currently plays for FK Široké. Before that he had played for Pohronie and Polish side Limanovia Limanowa. His former club were 1. FC Tatran Prešov and the Gambrinus liga club Slovácko.

References

External links
 1. FC Tatran Prešov profile 
 

1983 births
Living people
Sportspeople from Bojnice
Slovak footballers
Slovak expatriate footballers
Association football midfielders
FC Baník Prievidza players
1. FC Slovácko players
FC Hradec Králové players
ŠK Slovan Bratislava players
1. FC Tatran Prešov players
FK Senica players
MFK Ružomberok players
Limanovia Limanowa players
FK Pohronie players
FK Poprad players
Slovak Super Liga players
2. Liga (Slovakia) players
5. Liga players
II liga players
Expatriate footballers in the Czech Republic
Slovak expatriate sportspeople in the Czech Republic
Expatriate footballers in Poland
Slovak expatriate sportspeople in Poland